The Karkin people (also called Los Carquines in Spanish) are one of eight Ohlone peoples, indigenous peoples of California.

The Karkin people have historically lived in the Carquinez Strait region in the northeast portion of the San Francisco Bay estuary. They spoke the Karkin language, the only documentation of which is a single vocabulary obtained by linguist-missionary Felipe Arroyo de la Cuesta at Mission Dolores in 1821 from Karkin speaker Mariano Antonio Sagnegse. According to de la Cuesta, karkin means 'to trade.' Although meager, the records of Karkin show that it constituted a distinct branch of Costanoan/Ohlone, strikingly different from the neighboring Chochenyo and other Ohlone languages spoken farther south and across the bay. It is believed that there were about 200 Karkin speakers before colonization.

Starting in 1787, some Karkin people began moving to Mission Dolores in present-day San Francisco. In 1804 and 1807, Karkins resisted attempts by Mission Indians to recapture fugitive Indians who had escaped the mission. The last Karkins moved to the mission between 1809 and 1810. At the end of 1817, 49 Karkins were living at Mission Dolores. By the end of 1823, 35 Karkin people lived at Mission Dolores, Mission San Francisco Solano, and Mission San Jose, seven of whom had been born in the missions.

The Confederated Villages of Lisjan is a tribe made up of Karkin and six other neighboring indigenous groups.

Corrina Gould is a Karkin and Chochenyo activist who co-founded Indian People Organizing for Change and the Sogorea Te’ Land Trust, and is the spokesperson for the Confederated Villages of Lisjan.

See also 

 Sogorea Te Land Trust

Notes

References
 Beeler, Madison S. 1961.  "Northern Costanoan." International Journal of American Linguistics 27: 191–197.
 Callaghan, Catherine A. 1997. "Evidence for Yok-Utian." International Journal of American Linguistics 63:18–64.
 Golla, Victor. 2007. "Linguistic Prehistory." California Prehistory: Colonization, Culture, and Complexity. Terry L. Jones and Kathryn A. Klar, eds., pp. 71–82. New York: Altamira Press. .
 Levy 1978, cited in "Karkin". Survey of California and Other Indian Languages. University of California, Berkeley. Retrieved 16 August 2021.
 Milliken, Randall T. 1995. A Time of Little Choice: The Disintegration of Tribal Culture in the San Francisco Bay Region, 1769–1810. Menlo Park, CA: Ballena Press.
 Milliken, Randall T. 2008. Native Americans at Mission San Jose. Banning, CA: Malki-Ballena Press. .
 Milliken, Randall; Shoup, Laurence H.; Ortiz, Beverly R.; Archaeological and Historical Consultants Oakland, California (June 2009). Ohlone/Costanoan Indians of the San Francisco Peninsula and their Neighbors, Yesterday and Today (PDF) (Report). National Park Service Golden Gate National Recreation Area, San Francisco, California. Retrieved 16 August 2021.

External links
 Karkin language overview at the Survey of California and Other Indian Languages
 Costanoan/Ohlone Indian Language

Ohlone
Native American tribes in California
California Mission Indians
History of Contra Costa County, California
History of Solano County, California
History of the San Francisco Bay Area
Culture in the San Francisco Bay Area

fr:Karkin
hr:Karkin
pms:Lenga karkin